Laurel Historic District is a national historic district located at Laurel, Sussex County, Delaware.  The district includes 701 contributing buildings, 5 contributing sites, 4 contributing structures, and 1 contributing object in the central business district and surrounding residential areas of Laurel. It includes residential, commercial, industrial, and institutional buildings dated from the late-18th century to the 1930s.  The residential buildings are mostly frame structures in the "I-house" plan.  Most commercial buildings re brick structure and date to the early-20th century.  Notable non-residential buildings include the Dashiell Building, Sussex Trust Building, Mellon Bank Building, Laurel Railroad Station (c. 1905), firehouse (1937), the original water company building, more recent town water buildings, U.S. Post Office (1935), Centenary Methodist Church, St. Phillip's Episcopal Church the Methodist Protestant Church, and the I.O.O.F. Meeting Hall.

It was added to the National Register of Historic Places in 1988.

References

Historic districts on the National Register of Historic Places in Delaware
Historic districts in Sussex County, Delaware
Laurel, Delaware
National Register of Historic Places in Sussex County, Delaware